Noma Award for the Translation of Japanese Literature is a Japanese literary award that is part of the Noma Prize series. It is awarded annually for new translations of modern Japanese literature. It was founded in 1990.

Amongst those participating in the 1990 inaugural judging panel which determined the initial honoree was Robert Gottlieb, the editor of The New Yorker magazine. A $10,000 award for Acts of Worship accompanied the inaugural Prize which was presented to John Bester.

Select recipients

 1st 1990 English
 John Bester of Britain for translating Acts of Worship: Seven Stories by Yukio Mishima.
 2nd 1991 French
 Véronique Perrin for translating Yōko by Yoshikichi Furui
 Patrick De Vos of France for translating A Wild Sheep Chase by Haruki Murakami.
 3rd 1992 English
 Dennis Keene for translating Ghosts by Morio Kita.
 4th 1993 German
 Siegfried Schaarschmidt for translating The Decay of the Angel by Yukio Mishima
 Jürgen Berndt for translating works by Shūsaku Endō
 5th 1994 Italian
 Maria Teresa Orsi for translating "In the Forest, Under Cherries in Full Bloom" by Ango Sakaguchi
 6th 1995 English
 Edwin McClellan for translating Fragments of a Past: A Memoir by Eiji Yoshikawa
 7th 1996 Spanish
 Fernando Rodríguez-Izquierdo for translating The Face of Another by Kōbō Abe
 8th 1997 Scandinavian (Swedish)
 Gunilla Lindberg-Wada for translating Spring Snow by Yukio Mishima
 9th 1998 French
 Catherine Ancelot for translating Singular Rebellion by Saiichi Maruya
 Jacques Lalloz for translating Darkness in Summer by Takeshi Kaikō
 10th 1999 German
 Otto Putz for translating I Am a Cat by Natsume Sōseki and Nip the Buds, Shoot the Kids by Kenzaburō Ōe
 11th 2000 Dutch
 The Stones Cry Out by Hikaru Okuizumi
 12th 2001 Italian
 Giorgio Amitrano for translating Night on the Galactic Railroad by Kenji Miyazawa
 13th 2002 Chinese
 by Kafū Nagai
 14th 2003 English
 Jay Rubin for translating The Wind-Up Bird Chronicle by Haruki Murakami.
 15th 2005 Korean
 Yang Yoon-ok for translating L'Eclipse by Keiichiro Hirano
 16th 2007 Russian
 Boris Akunin of Russia for translating fascists banned works by Yukio Mishima.
 17th 2009 French
 Anne Bayard-Sakai for translating Ikebukuro West Gate Park by Ira Ishida
 Jacques Lévy for translating Miracles by Kenji Nakagami
 18th 2011 Chinese
 Tokugawa Ieyasu 13 by Sōhachi Yamaoka
 Tokyo Wankei by Shuichi Yoshida
 19th 2013 English
 Roger Pulvers for translation of Be not Defeated by the Rain by Kenji Miyazawa.

References

Awards established in 1990
Japanese literary awards
Translation awards
1990 establishments in Japan
Noma Prize